Aleksa Šantić ((); 27 May 1868 – 2 February 1924) was a poet from Bosnia and Herzegovina. His poetry reflecting both the urban culture of the region. The most common themes of his poems are social injustice, nostalgic love, and the unity of the South Slavs. He was the editor-in-chief of the magazine Zora (1896–1901). Šantić was one of the leading persons of Serbian literary and national movement in Mostar. In 1914 Šantić became a member of the Serbian Royal Academy.

Early life 
Aleksa Šantić was born into a Herzegovinian Serb family in 1868 in Mostar in the Ottoman Empire. His father Risto was a merchant, and his mother Mara was from notable Aničić family from Mostar. He had three siblings: brothers Jeftan and Jakov and sister Radojka known as Persa; another sister Zorica died in infancy. The family did not have much patience for Aleksa's lyrical talents.

Just as Aleksa turned 10 years of age, Bosnia Vilayet (including Mostar) was occupied by Austria-Hungary as per decision made by European Great Powers at the Congress of Berlin during summer of 1878.

Aleksa's father Risto died, which is when his brother Miho known as Adža (Aleksa's uncle) got custody of Aleksa and his siblings. In 1880 and 1881, Šantić attended a Merchant school in Trieste in Italian language. While studying in Trieste, Šantić lived with his uncles Lazar and Todor Aničić who were merchants in Trieste. In 1881, Šantić became a student of a merchant school in Ljubljana (Marova Akademija) where lectures were given in German.

In 1883, he returned to Mostar with knowledge of Italian and German languages.

Serb cultural movement 
Together with Svetozar Ćorović and Jovan Dučić, Šantić was a follower of romanticism of Vojislav Ilić and among most important leaders of cultural and national movement of Herzegovina Serbs.

Šantić and Ćorović intended to establish a journal for Serb children called Херцеговче, not only for Serb children from Herzegovina, but for all Serb children.

Šantić was one of the notable members of the Serb cultural society Prosvjeta. The hymn of the society was authored by Šantić.

Šantić presided over the Serbian Singing Society "Gusle" established in 1888. In this society Šantić was not only its president but also a lead singer of its chorus, composer and lecturer. The literature magazin Zora was published under patronage of "Gusle". Šantić became the editor-in-chief of this magazine review Zora (1896–1901) published by Serbian Cultural Society in Mostar which was among the most important societies which struggled for preservation of Serb cultural autonomy and national rights. Zora became one of the best Serbian literature magazines. The journal Zora gathered members of the Serbian intelligentsia who strived to improve education of Serbian population necessary to reach economic and political progress.

In 1903 Šantić was among the founders of the Serbian Gymnastics Society "Obilić".

In this capacity he came into focus of the life of this region which, by its cultural and national consciousness, showed a stubborn opposition to the German Kulturträger. In the spring of 1909, because of the Bosnian Crisis caused by the annexation of Bosnia and Herzegovina by Austria-Hungary, Šantić had to escape to Italy together with Nikola Kašiković and Ćorović. In 1910, the Šantić family bought a country house in the village Borci, near Konjic from Austro-Hungarian baron Benko who built it in 1902.

The product of his patriotic inspiration during the Balkan Wars of 1912–1913 is the book Na starim ognjištima (1913). Šantić belonged to poets who wrote whole collections of songs glorifying victories of Army of Kingdom of Serbia during the Balkan Wars, including On the coast of Drač which glorifies liberation of the ancient city that once was part of the Serbian Kingdom under King Milutin. On 3 February 1914, Šantić became a member of the Serbial Royal Academy (precedent of the modern Serbian Academy of Sciences and Arts).

During World War I, he was taken by the Austrians as hostage, but he survived the war. Šantić moved from Mostar to Borci near Konjic in 1914 when suspicious urban Serb population of Mostar was evacuated from the town. On 13 November 1914, Austrian governor in Sarajevo banned Šantić's collection of poems Pjesme published in 1911.

Šantić was a prolific poet and writer. He wrote almost 800 poems, seven theatrical plays and some prose. Many of the writings were of high quality and aimed to criticize the Establishment or advocate diverse social and cultural issues. He was strongly influenced by Heinrich Heine, whose works he translated. His friends and peers in the field of culture were Svetozar Ćorović, Jovan Dučić and Milan Rakić. One of his sisters, Radojka (Persa) married Svetozar Ćorović.

Works

Šantić worked as merchant for his father and read a lot of books before he decided to write poetry and met another young merchant, Jovan Dučić from Trebinje who published his first poem in 1886 in the youth literature magazine Pidgeon in Sombor (modern-day Serbia). Following example of his friend Jovan Dučić, Šantić also published his first song in literature magazine Pidgeon, its 1887 New Year's Eve edition.

The first poems Šantić published were inspired by older Serbian poets like Njegoš, Zmaj, Vojislav Ilić and Jakšić. The first collection of Šantićs songs was published in Mostar in 1891. He awarded all income from its sales to erecting the monument of Sima Milutinović Sarajlija. In 1901 Bogdan Popović wrote negative critics of Šantić's poetry. Popović's critics had positive and stimulative effect on young Šantić and the quality of his future works.

The oeuvre of Aleksa Šantić, widely accessible yet acutely personal, is a blend of fine-tuned emotional sensibility and clear-eyed historical awareness, steeped in the specifics of local culture. He worked at the crossroads of two centuries and more than other poets of his generation, combined theoretical and poetic suffering nineteenth and twentieth centuries. At the same time, Šantić writes about his personal troubles – the loss of close and dear people (his mother, brothers Jeftan and Jakov, and brother-in-law Svetozar Ćorović), the health that was a lifetime problem and loneliness that accompanied him to the end. Drawing themes and imagery from his hometown Mostar, the atmospheric capital of Mediterranean Herzegovina, and its surroundings, his poetry is marked in equal part by the late-Ottoman urban culture in the region, its social distinctions, subdued passions and melancholy, as well as the South Slavic national awareness.

He was influenced mostly by the poets Jovan Jovanović Zmaj, Vojislav Ilić and Heinrich Heine, whom he was translating. He is said to have reached his greatest poetic maturity between 1905 and 1910, when he wrote his best poems. Šantić's poetry is full of emotion, sadness and pain of love and defiance of social and national disempowered people whom he himself belonged. His muse is at the crossroads of love and patriotism, beloved ideal, and suffering people. The topics and images of his poems ranged from strong emotions for social injustices of his time to nostalgic love. His poems about Mostar and the Neretva river are particularly praised. Šantić wrote a number of love songs in the style of the Bosnian love songs, sevdalinkas. His most well known poem-turned-sevdalinka is Emina, to which music was composed and it is often sung at restaurants (kafanas). The ambiance of his love poems include the neighborhood gardens, flowers, baths, fountains, and girls who appear in them are decorated with a necklace, the challenging but the hidden beauty. This is right about the song "Emina". The spirit of this song is so striking that it became the nation's favorite and sings as sevdalinka. In love songs the most common motive is the desire. The poet watches his beloved from afar and longing often turns into sadness because of unrequited love and the failure of life. His patriotic poetry is poetry about his motherland and her citizens ("My homeland"). In some of his most moving poems Šantić sings about the suffering of those who leave the country forever and go into an unknown and alien world ("Stay here", "Bread"). Šantić emphasizes suffering and martyrdom as the most important moments in the historical destiny of the people ("We know destiny").

During his life he wrote six volumes of poetry (1891, 1895, 1900, 1908, 1911, 1913), as well as some dramatizations in verse, the best of which are Pod maglom (In the Fog; 1907) and Hasan-Aginica (1911). He also translated Heine's Lyrisches Intermezzo (1897–1898), prepared an anthology of translated German poets, Iz nemacke lirike (From German Lyrics; 1910), made Bosnian renderings of Schiller's Wilhelm Tell (1922) and translated Pjesme roba (Poems of a Slave; 1919) from the Czech writer Svatopluk Čech. He also translated successfully from German. Šantić was one of the founders of the cultural newspaper "Dawn" as the president of the Serbian Singing Society "Gusle". There he met and socialized with famous poets of that era: Svetozar Ćorović, Jovan Dučić, Osman Đikić, Milan Rakić. Šantić died on 2 February 1924 in his hometown of tuberculosis.

Legacy
Aleksa Šantić is a village in Serbia named after this poet. He is also pictured on 10 Bosnia and Herzegovina convertible marks bill.
In 1920 Sokol Union in Mostar was named after Šantić. In 1969 the Assembly of the Mostar municipality established the Literature Award "Aleksa Šantić" in honor of centinel of his birth.

A bust of Aleksa Šantić is erected in Kalemegdan Park in Belgrade, Serbia.

In the 1980s a movie called Moj brat Aleksa (My Brother Aleksa) was produced in his memory.

Works

Pjesme, Mostar, 1891
Pjesme, Mostar, 1895
Pjesme, Mostar, 1901
Pod maglom, Belgrade, 1907
Pjesme, Mostar, 1908
Pjesme, Belgrade, 1911
Hasanaginica, 1911
Na starim ognjištima, Mostar, 1913
Pesme, Zagreb, 1918?
Pesme, Belgrade 1924
Translations
Lirski intermeco, Mostar, a translation of poems by Heinrich Heine, Mostar, 1897
Iz njemačke lirike, anthology of German poetry, Mostar, 1910
Pjesme roba, translation of poems by Svatopluk Čech, Sarajevo 1919
Vilijem Tel, a translation of William Tell by Friedrich Schiller, Belgrade, 1922
Iz Hajneove lirike, a translation of poems by Heinrich Heine, Mostar, 1923

References

Sources

Bibliography

 
 
 
 
 
 
 
 
 
 
 
 
 
 
 
 
 Jovan Skerlić, Istorija Nove Srpske Književnosti/History of New Serbian Literature (Belgrade, 1914, 1921), pages 421–422.

External links

 
 Translated works by Aleksa Šantić

1868 births
1924 deaths
Writers from Mostar
Serbs of Bosnia and Herzegovina
Bosnia and Herzegovina poets
Members of the Serbian Academy of Sciences and Arts
Serbian writers
Yugoslavism
World War I prisoners of war held by Austria-Hungary
Burials in Bosnia and Herzegovina